Ralph Marcus Hare (1914-2009) was a British aircraft engineer. He was a longtime engineer at the aviation firm de Havilland and worked on the production and development of the de Havilland Mosquito.

Early life 
Hare was born in Radlett, Hertfordshire on 18 August 1914. He was the oldest of 8 children. He was apprenticed (1928) to De Havilland at Stag Lane working in wood and won a scholarship to become a student (1934) in the DH Technical School where he learnt about design. He was transferred to the main Drawing Office at Hatfield where he was given stressing work.  He worked completely alone in stressing the wings of the DH Hornet Moth; a job which he finished in  months.  He advanced very quickly, lecturing at the Technical School from 1936 - 1952.

His strengths were recognised and was chosen, in 1939, to join the initial 9-men team working on overall loads and wing strengths calculations in secret at Salisbury Hall when the Mosquito plans went under way as authorised by Sir Geoffrey De Havilland.  It was a team of which he was the youngest member and included the chief test pilot, John Cunningham (Cat's Eyes).  The work involved using wood especially the lightest of woods imported from Canada - balsa wood, which made the Mosquito the lightest and fastest plane of its time.

De Havilland 
Ralph was made Chief Stressman of De Havilland in 1955, Deputy Chief Structural Engineer in 1967 and Chief Structural Engineer in 1971, taking charge of all four structural departments, as the company changed from being De Havilland to Hawker Siddeley, then to British Aerospace.

Altogether during his 50+ years of working with DH and its successors at Hatfield, he worked on designs for over 40 different aircraft including the Albatross, Flamingo, Vampire, Hornet, Comet, Trident, Airbus wings together with the Consortium in Toulouse and finally the BAe 146. He was a very able mathematician but would only eve use his trusted slide rule to make calculations.

He travelled the world and had to go out to the Comet air disasters which were attributed to faults in the fuselage (windows) not the wings which were his responsibility at the time.  He had a tremendously strong work ethic and, although very kind, did not suffer fools gladly i.e. there is a comment online about him being very severe with someone who evidently bears a grudge: this would be the case as Ralph was keen that every member of his team should contribute to the full.

He represented British Industry on the Joint Airworthiness Requirements for Europe (J.A.R.) Structures Committee for 9 years from its inception in 1970.  He served on several Industry Committees.

Retirement 
Hare retired in 1980. He died on 4 May 2009 at the age of 94 and was buried in Hatfield Cemetery.

References

1914 births
2009 deaths
English aerospace engineers
People from Radlett